The David J. Sencer CDC Museum, often referred to as the CDC Museum, is museum about the U.S. Centers for Disease Control and Prevention located in Atlanta, Georgia. The museum is affiliated with the Smithsonian Institution.

Mission

History 
The museum was founded in 1996 as the Global Health Odyssey Museum. This was done during the 50th anniversary of the CDC and coincided with the 1996 Summer Olympics in Atlanta. In 2011, the museum was renamed the David J. Sencer CDC Museum. This was done in honor of David Sencer, an American public health official who was the longest serving director of the CDC.

In 2020 and 2021, the museum was temporarily closed because of the COVID-19 pandemic.

The museum has free admission and is open year round. The museum receives approximately 90,000 visitors annually.

Exhibitions at the museum include public health topics and the history of the CDC. The museum is a Smithsonian Affiliate Museum.

References

Further reading

External links 
 Official website

Centers for Disease Control and Prevention
Museums in Atlanta
1996 establishments in Georgia (U.S. state)
Museums established in 1996